Kesthur  is a village in the southern state of Karnataka, India. It is located in the Yelandur taluk of Chamarajanagar district in Karnataka.

Demographics
 India census, Kesthur had a population of 5739 with 2925 males and 2814 females.

See also
 Chamarajanagar
 Districts of Karnataka

References

External links
 http://Chamarajanagar.nic.in/

Villages in Chamarajanagar district